Phan Văn Santos (born Fábio dos Santos on 30 September 1977) is a retired naturalized Vietnamese footballer who played as a goalkeeper and currently an amateur coach and a football instructor for children in Ho Chi Minh City.

Santos is the highest-scoring goalkeeper in all of Asia with 22 goals. While playing for Đồng Tâm Long An at the 2006 AFC Champions League, he scored a free kick against Shanghai Shenhua, becoming the first goalkeeper to score in the history of the competition.

He played for Vietnam in the match against Brazil's Olympic team in August 2008.

See also
List of goalscoring goalkeepers

References

External links

 CBF
 Official profile

1977 births
Association football goalkeepers
Boavista Sport Club players
Brazilian emigrants to Vietnam
Naturalized citizens of Vietnam
Campo Grande Atlético Clube players
CR Vasco da Gama players
Living people
Footballers from Rio de Janeiro (city)
Vietnamese footballers
Brazilian footballers
Vietnam international footballers
Vietnamese expatriate footballers
Navibank Sài Gòn FC players
Becamex Binh Duong FC players
V.League 1 players